Radomír Šimůnek Jr. (born 6 September 1983) is a Czech racing cyclist, who competes for the -Stannah team. Born in Plzeň, Šimůnek participates mainly in cyclo-cross and has won a silver medal at the Junior and under-23 World Championships. His father, also named Radomír, was also a cyclo-cross racer.

Major results

2000
 1st in National Championship, Cyclo-cross, Juniors, Czech Republic (CZE)
2001
 2nd in World Championship, Cyclo-cross, Juniors, Tabor
2003
 3rd in Lostice, Cyclo-cross (CZE)
 2nd in National Championship, Cyclo-cross, U23, Czech Republic, Louny (CZE)
2004
 2nd in National Championship, Cyclo-cross, U23, Czech Republic (CZE)
 2nd in Mlada Boleslav, Cyclo-cross (b) (CZE)
 3rd in Podborany, Cyclo-cross (CZE)
 3rd in Plzen, Cyclo-cross (CZE)
 1st in Lostice, Cyclo-cross (CZE)
 1st in Hamme-Zogge, Cyclo-cross, U23 (BEL)
 3rd in Ceska Lipa, Cyclo-cross (CZE)
2005
 3rd in National Championship, Cyclo-cross, U23, Czech Republic, Mlada Boleslav (CZE)
 2nd in World Championship, Cyclo-cross, U23, Sankt-Wendel
 3rd in Vorselaar, Cyclo-cross, U23 (BEL)
2006
 3rd in National Championship, Cyclo-cross, Elite, Czech Republic, Podborany (CZE)
 1st in Mlada Boleslav, Cyclo-cross (CZE)
 3rd in Podborany, Cyclo-cross, Podborany (CZE)
 2nd in Schulteiss-Cup, Cyclo-cross (GER)
 1st in Tabor, Cyclo-cross (CZE)
 2nd in Asteasu, Cyclo-cross (ESP)
2007
 3rd in National Championship, Cyclo-cross, Elite, Czech Republic, Ceska Lipa (CZE)
 3rd in Plzen, Cyclo-cross (CZE)
 3rd in Unicov, Cyclo-cross (CZE)
 3rd in Asteasu, Cyclo-cross (ESP)
 1st in Antwerpen, Cyclo-cross (BEL)
 2nd in Nommay, Cyclo-cross (FRA)
 2nd in Diegem, Cyclo-cross (BEL)
2008
 2nd in Sint-Niklaas, Cyclo-cross (BEL)
 2nd in National Championship, Cyclo-cross, Elite, Czech Republic, Mnichovo Hradiště (CZE)
 3rd in Roubaix, Cyclo-cross (FRA)

References

External links
 

1983 births
Living people
People from Jilemnice
Czech male cyclists
Cyclo-cross cyclists
Sportspeople from the Liberec Region